Suneet "Sunny" Tripathy (born October 27, 1989), also referred to as stage name 'Sunny T, is an Indian-American actor, comedian, writer, producer, Mr. India Global and a former model.

Personal life
Tripathy, was born in Brampton, Canada to an Indian-American father and mother. Tripathy currently resides in Los Angeles, California and is fluent in English, French, Hindi and Odia. After high school, Tripathy attended UCLA for engineering and applied for the undergraduate film program but was rejected twice. He graduated from University of California, Los Angeles in 2012 with a Bachelor of Arts in Political Science.

In 2005 Sunny was the victim of a hate crime on the day of his prom, where he was attacked by neo-Nazi gang members outside of Stoneridge Mall in Pleasanton, California. The attack on the 16-year-old, which was thought to be racially inclined, took place in broad daylight and left the Foothill High School student in the hospital with limited ability to walk. Tripathy suffered a shattered clavicle, a damaged back, broken nose, a fractured arm and multiple bruises and cuts.

Career

Tripathy won the 1st season of Last Teen Comic Standing at the age of 17 and performed stand-up specials in Toronto, Los Angeles, San Francisco and Seattle.

In 2011, Tripathy's short film, Naked Innocence, won several awards. The short was also honored at Warner Bros. in June 2011.

In 2012, he won the titles of Mr. Photogenic and Mr. India West Coast of the Miss India America Pageant. He went on to model for several brands including Mountain Dew, Adidas Collegiate, UCLA, HFDC Bank, Dreams Collection and BearWear.

In fall 2012, Sunny produced a reality television pilot called The Grind featuring Sahil Punamia (Keeping Up With the Guptas), Michael Vayder, Shafic Tayara, pop-artist Vinita and Ron Artest (MettaWorld Peace) from the Los Angeles Lakers. The show was never released to the public.

In December 2012, Tripathy was named among the Top 50 Coolest Desis In The World, sharing the list with Mindy Kaling, Priyanka Chopra, and Malala Yousafzai.

In July 2014 and at the age of 24, Tripathy sold his first pilot script and reached a development deal with 20th Century Fox Television, to create a show based on him and his family.

Charity work
Tripathy is an ambassador to The Hunger Project and is an active donor to the UCLA Ronald Reagan Children's Hospital. In November 2013, he hosted a birthday event to raise money and toys for the hospitals pediatric patients.

Many of Tripathy's film projects often resonate themes of social justice issues. His project, Naked Innocence, was in response to several teen bullying and suicide cases in 2010. The Locket, was in tribute to the victims of the 2011 terrorist attack in Oslo, Norway.

Sunny is involved with other non-profit organizations including Every 15 Minutes, The Odisha Society of the Americas, SEEDS, and the Sheila Kar Heart Foundation.

Filmography

Awards and nominations

References

Further reading

1989 births
Living people
American male film actors
Male models from California
21st-century American male actors
American male actors of Indian descent
Canadian emigrants to the United States
Canadian people of Indian descent
Male actors from California
UCLA Henry Samueli School of Engineering and Applied Science alumni